Jakub Dobeš (born May 27, 2001) is a Czech ice hockey goaltender for the Ohio State University of the National Collegiate Athletic Association (NCAA). He was selected 146th overall by the Montreal Canadiens in the 2020 NHL Entry Draft.

Playing career
Dobeš committed to play college ice hockey for the Ohio State University during the 2021–22 season. Dobeš had an outstanding freshman year, posting a 2.26 goals against average (GAA) and a 93.4 save percentage. His efforts resulted in multiple awards at seasons end, including the All-Big Ten Freshman Team, the All-Big Ten First Team, Big Ten Goaltender of the Year, and Co-Big Ten Freshman of the Year, which he split with Luke Hughes. He was also named a semifinalist for the Mike Richter Award, which is awarded to the best men's ice hockey goaltender in the NCAA.

Career statistics

Regular season and playoffs

Awards and honours

References

External links
 Ohio State Buckeyes bio

Living people
2001 births
Czech ice hockey goaltenders
Montreal Canadiens draft picks
Omaha Lancers players
Ohio State Buckeyes men's ice hockey players
Sportspeople from Ostrava
Czech expatriate ice hockey players in the United States